A pilot study, pilot project, pilot test, or pilot experiment is a small-scale preliminary study conducted to evaluate feasibility, duration, cost, adverse events, and improve upon the study design prior to performance of a full-scale research project.

Implementation
Pilot experiments are frequently carried out before large-scale quantitative research, in an attempt to avoid time and money being used on an inadequately designed project. A pilot study is usually carried out on members of the relevant population. A pilot study is used to formulate the design of the full-scale experiment which then can be adjusted. The pilot study is potentially a critical insight to clinical trial design, 
recruitment and sample size of participants, treatment testing, and statistical analysis to improve the power of testing the hypothesis of the study. Analysis from the pilot experiment can be added to the full-scale (and more expensive) experiment to improve the chances of a clear outcome.

Applications

In sociology, pilot studies can be referred to as small-scale studies that will help identify design issues before the main research is done. Although pilot experiments have a well-established tradition, their usefulness as a strategy for change has been questioned, at least in the domain of environmental management. Extrapolation from a pilot study to large scale strategy may not be assumed as possible, partly due to the exceptional resources and favorable conditions that accompany a pilot study.

In clinical research, studies conducted in preparation for a future randomized controlled trial are known as "pilot" and "feasibility" studies, where pilot studies are a subset of feasibility studies. A feasibility study asks whether the study should proceed, and if so, how. A pilot study asks the same questions, but also has a specific design feature: in a pilot study, a future study is conducted on a smaller scale, which, if having produced positive results, may lead to a Phase I clinical trial. The use of pilot and feasibility studies to estimate treatment effect is controversial, with ongoing methodologic discussion about appropriateness.

A checklist was published in 2016 to provide guidance on how to report pilot trials.

See also 
 Dry run (testing)
 Mass production
 Mock-up
 Pilot plant
 Proof of concept
 Prototype

References 

Industrial design
Evaluation methods
Scientific method